Young Irish Film Makers (YIFM) is a film training and production company set up in 1991 to help young people aged 13 to 20 make digital feature films.

In 1998 they produced their first feature Under the Hawthorn Tree for Channel 4 and RTÉ.

In 2002 YIFM set up the National Youth Film School to allow young people from all over Ireland and abroad to spend five weeks shooting a major feature film for television. Two films produced under the National Youth Film School, The Children (IMDB) and Stealaway (IMDB), have won awards at the Moondance International Film Festival.

Filmography
Under the Hawthorn Tree (1998) (TV) 
D'Boyz (2001) 
Skegs & Skangers (2002) 
The Children (2002) 
Stealaway (2005) 
Lily's Bad Day (2006)
Eliza Mayflower (in post-production)
Suckers (2007 DVD out Now - www.yifm.com)
The Suitors (2009 can be viewed now on yifm.com)
Viral (2010)
The Usurpers (In Post Production)
The H Factor (2010) (Short Film)
Red and Green" (2010) (Short Film)Future History (2010) (Short Film)Speed Getaway (2010) (Short Film)Dublin Zoo 2 (2010) (Short Film)The Cubicle (2010) (Short Film)Goldman's Mind (2014) (Short Film)Aura (2015) (Short Film) (In an endless loop)Tables Turned (2016) (In Post-Production)Leaves (2016) (Contemporary Music Video)My Heart Will Go On (2016) (Music Video)BraceFace (2016) (Short Film)Murder He Wrote'' (2017) (Short Film)

External links
YIFM.com
Social Network

Educational organisations based in Ireland
Youth organisations based in the Republic of Ireland
Summer camps in Ireland
Film schools in Ireland